Principles of Corporate Insolvency Law (3rd edn Thomson, London 2005) by Roy Goode of the University of Oxford is a leading textbook on UK insolvency law. The forthcoming edition in 2010 will be taken over by Professor Robert Stevens, of University College London.

Outline of principles
Professor Goode's suggested ten principles of corporate insolvency law are as follows.

 corporate insolvency law recognises rights accrued under the general law prior to liquidation
 only the assets of the debtor company are available for its creditors
 security interests and other real rights created prior to the insolvency proceeding are unaffected by the winding up
 the liquidator takes the assets subject to all limitations and defences
 the pursuit of personal rights against the company is converted into a right to prove for a dividend in the liquidation
 on liquidation the company ceases to be the beneficial owner of its assets
 no creditor has any interest in specie in the company's assets or realisations
 liquidations accelerates creditors' rights to payment
 unsecured creditors rank pari passu
 members of a company are not as such liable for its debts

See also
United Kingdom insolvency law

Notes

References
R Goode, Principles of Corporate Insolvency Law (3rd edn Thomson, London 2005)
V Finch, Corporate Insolvency Law: Perspectives and Principles (2009)
A Keay and P Walton, Insolvency Law: Corporate and Personal (2nd edn Jordans, London 2008)

External links
 Insolvency Service website
 Insolvency Practitioners Association website
 Insolvency Service website

Insolvency law of the United Kingdom